Acta Physiologica is a monthly peer-reviewed scientific journal that is published by Wiley-Blackwell on behalf of the Scandinavian Physiological Society. According to the Journal Citation Reports, it has a 2017 impact factor of  5.97. It is the official journal of the Federation of European Physiological Societies.

The journal was established in 1889 as the Skandinavisches Archiv für Physiologie and renamed to Acta Physiologica Scandinavica in 1940, before obtaining its current name in 2006.

References

External links 
 

Wiley-Blackwell academic journals
Physiology journals
English-language journals
Monthly journals
Publications established in 1889